The New Zealand Herald and Auckland Gazette was Auckland's first newspaper. It ran from July 1841 to January 1842, until it offended Governor William Hobson so much it was closed down. It is not related to the current New Zealand Herald, which was first published in 1863.

References
Clyde Romer Hughes Taylor. Printing: General Survey, from An Encyclopaedia of New Zealand, edited by A. H. McLintock, originally published in 1966. Te Ara - The Encyclopedia of New Zealand, updated 2007-09-18. Accessed 2007-12-23.

Defunct newspapers published in New Zealand
Mass media in Auckland